Route 371 is a provincial highway located in the Capitale-Nationale region in south-central Quebec. The highway starts in the Val-Bélair neighborhood in Quebec City at the junction of Autoroute 573 and ends in Stoneham-et-Tewkesbury at the junctions of Autoroute 73 and Route 175.

Towns along Route 371

 Quebec City (Val-Bélair)
 Valcartier
 Saint-Gabriel-de-Valcartier
 Stoneham-et-Tewkesbury

See also

 List of Quebec provincial highways

References

External links 
 Official Transports Quebec Road Map Network 
Route 371 on Google Maps

371
Roads in Capitale-Nationale
Streets in Quebec City